Sir Charles Norton Edgcumbe Eliot  (8 January 1862 – 16 March 1931) was a British diplomat, colonial administrator and botanist. He served as Commissioner of British East Africa in 1900–1904. He was British Ambassador to Japan in 1919–1925.

He was also known as a malacologist and marine biologist. He described a number of sea slug species, including Chelidonura varians.

Career
Eliot was born in the village of Sibford Gower near Banbury, Oxfordshire, England and educated at Cheltenham College and Balliol College, Oxford, where he took a double first in classical moderations and Greats, as well as winning the Craven, Ireland and Hertford scholarships. Remarkably, he also won the Boden Sanskrit Scholarship and the Houghton Syriac prize. He was a noteworthy linguist, with a full knowledge of 16 languages and conversant in 20 more.

Eliot served in diplomatic posts in Russia (1885), Morocco (1892), Turkey (1893), and Washington, D.C. (1899). He also served as British Commissioner in Samoa. He was appointed a Companion of the Order of the Bath (CB) in the 1898 Birthday Honours and was knighted as a Knight Commander of the Order of St Michael and St George (KCMG) in the New Year honours list 1 January 1900.

British East Africa
In 1900, he was appointed commissioner of British East Africa, and on 1 January 1902 he was appointed Commissioner, Commander-in-Chief and Consul-General for the East Africa Protectorate, including the mainland dominions of the Sultan of Zanzibar, and also as British Agent and Consul-General for the island dominions of the Sultan. In December 1902 he hosted the British colonial secretary (Joseph Chamberlain) during his tour of the African colonies.

In April 1902, the first application for land in British East Africa was made by the East Africa Syndicate – a company in which financiers belonging to the British South Africa Company were interested – which sought a grant of   sq. m., and this was followed by other applications for considerable areas, a scheme being also propounded for a large Jewish settlement (which was rejected by the world Jewish community). During 1903 the arrival of hundreds of prospective settlers, chiefly from South Africa, led to the decision to entertain no more applications for large areas of land, especially as questions were raised concerning the preservation for the Maasai of their rights of pasturage. In the 24 October 1903 edition of the Natal Witness, Eliot wrote: "There can be no doubt that the Maasai and many other tribes must go under. It is a prospect that I view with equanimity...I have no desire to protect Maasaidom...the sooner it disappears and it is unknown, except in books of anthropology, the better..." In April 1903, Major Frederick Russell Burnham, the famous American scout and then a Director of the East African Syndicate, sent an expedition consisting of John Weston Brooke, John Charles Blick, Mr. Bittlebank, and Mr. Brown, to assess the mineral wealth of the region. The party, known as the "Four B.'s", travelled from Nairobi via Mount Elgon northwards to the western shores of Lake Rudolph, experiencing plenty of privations from want of water, and of the danger from encounters with the Maasai.

In the carrying out of this policy of colonisation a dispute arose between Eliot and Lord Lansdowne, the British Foreign Secretary. Lansdowne, believing himself bound by pledges given to the East Africa Syndicate, decided that they should be granted the lease of the  they had applied for; but after consulting officials of the protectorate then in London, he refused Eliot permission to conclude leases for  each to two applicants from South Africa. Eliot thereupon resigned his post, and in a public telegram to the prime minister, dated Mombasa, 21 June 1904, gave as his reason:- "Lord Lansdowne ordered me to refuse grants of land to certain private persons while giving a monopoly of land on unduly advantageous terms to the East Africa Syndicate. I have refused to execute these instructions, which I consider unjust and impolitic." On the day Sir Charles sent this telegram, Sir Donald William Stewart, the chief commissioner of Ashanti (Ghana), was appointed his successor.

University administration
In 1905 Eliot was the first Vice-Chancellor of the newly created University of Sheffield until 1912 when he was appointed the first Vice-Chancellor of the University of Hong Kong; he served there until 1918 when he was recalled to the diplomatic service becoming high commissioner and consul-general in Siberia.

Japan
He was the British Ambassador to Japan in 1920–1926: though the position was not renewed, he stayed in Japan, studying the practice of Buddhism there. He regretted the 1921 decision to end the Anglo-Japanese alliance in 1923.

Taken ill with influenza, he decided to return to England but died on the journey on 16 March 1931 and was buried at sea in the Straits of Malacca. He never married.

Selected works
In a statistical overview derived from writings by and about Sir Charles Eliot, OCLC/WorldCat encompasses roughly 106 works in 355 publications in 2 languages and 4,509 library holdings.

 The East Africa Protectorate (1905) 
 
 
 ; ; 
 Japanese Buddhism (1935) 
 A Finnish Grammar (1890) 
 "Letters from the Far East" (1907)

Malacology 

 1900. Notes on tectibranchs and naked mollusks from Samoa. Proceedings of the Academy of Natural Science, Philadelphia, pp. 512–523, pl. 19.
 1901. Notes on a remarkable nudibranch from north-west America. Proceedings of the Malacological Society of London 4(4):163-165.
 1903. 
 1903a. On some nudibranchs from east Africa and Zanzibar, part II. Proceedings of the Zoological Society of London 1:250-257.
 1903b. On some nudibranchs from east Africa and Zanzibar. Part III. Dorididae Cryptobranchiatae, I. Proceedings of the Zoological Society of London 2:354-385, pls. 22–24.
 1904. 
 1904a. On some nudibranchs from east Africa and Zanzibar. Part V. Proceedings of the Zoological Society of London 2:83-105, pls. 3–4.
 1904b. On the Doris planata of Alder and Hancock. Proceedings of the Malacological Society of London 6(3):180-181.
 1905. Note on Geitodoris planata (Alder & Hancock). Proceedings of the Malacological Society of London 6(4):186-187.
 1905a. On some nudibranchs from the Pacific, including a new genus, Chromodoridella. Proceedings of the Malacological Society of London 6(4):229-238.
 1905b. Notes on two rare British nudibranchs, Hero formosa, var. arborescens, and Staurodoris maculata. Proceedings of the Malacological Society of London 6(4):239-243.
 1905c. On some nudibranchs from east Africa and Zanzibar. Part VI. Proceedings of the Zoological Society of London 2:268-298, pls. 16–17.
 1905d. 
 1905f. Nudibranchs from the Indo-Pacific. I. Notes on a collection dredged near Karachi and Maskat. Journal of Conchology 11(8):237-256.
 1906. The genus Doriopsilla Bergh. Journal of Conchology 11(12):366-367.
 1906a. On the nudibranchs of southern India and Ceylon, with special reference to the drawings by Kelaart and the collections belonging to Alder and Hancock preserved in the Hancock Museum at Newcastle upon Tyne. Proceedings of the Zoological Society of London, pp. 636–691, pls. 42–47.
 1906b. On the nudibranchs of southern India and Ceylon, with special reference to the drawings by Kelaart and the collections belonging to Alder and Hancock preserved in the Hancock Museum at Newcastle upon Tyne.—No. 2. Proceedings of the Zoological Society of London, pp. 999–1008.
 1906c. Notes on some British nudibranchs. Journal of the Marine Biological Association, new series, 7(3):333-382, pls. 11–12.
 1906d. Report upon a collection of Nudibranchiata from the Cape Verde Islands, with notes by C. Crossland. Proceedings of the Malacological Society of London 7(3):131-159, pl. 14.
 1906e. Nudibranchiata, with some remarks on the families and genera and description of a new genus, Doridomorpha, pp. 540–573, pl. 32. In: J. Stanley Gardiner (Ed.) The fauna and geography of the Maldive and Laccadive Archipelagoes, being the account of the work carried on and of the collections made by an expedition during the years 1899 and 1900, vol. 2.
 1907. Nudibranchs from the Indo-Pacific. III. Journal of Conchology 12(3):81-92.
 1907a. Nudibranchs from New Zealand and the Falkland Islands. Proceedings of the Malacological Society of London 7(6):327-361, pl. 28.
 1907b. Mollusca. IV. Nudibranchiata. National Antarctic Expedition 1901–1904. Natural History 2:1-28, 1 pl.
 1908. 
 1908a. 
 1909. Report on the nudibranchs collected by Mr. James Hornell at Okhamandal in Kattiawar in 1905–6. In: Report to the government of Baroda on the marine zoology of Okhamandal 1:137-145.
 1909a. Notes on a collection of nudibranchs from Ceylon. Spolia Zeylanica. Colombo 6(23):79-95.
 1909b. The Nudibranchiata of the Scottish National Antarctic Expedition. Report of the Scientific Results of the Voyage of S. Y. "Scotia" during the years 1902, 1903, and 1904, under the leadership of William S. Bruce, Volume V—Zoology, Part II, Nudibranchiata, pp. 11–24.
 1910. 
 1910a. 
 1910b. On some nudibranchs from the coast of Natal. Annals of the Natal Museum 2:221- 225.
 1910d. A monograph of the British nudibranchiate Mollusca: with figures of the species. pt. VIII (supplementary). Figures by the late Joshua Alder and the late Albany Hancock, and others, pp. 1–198, pls. 1–8. Ray Society, London.
 1911. Chromodorids from the Red Sea, collected and figured by Mr. Cyril Crossland. Proceedings of the Zoological Society of London, pp. 1068–1072, pl. 61.
 1912. A note on the rare British nudibranch Hancockia eudactylota Gosse. Proceedings of the Zoological Society of London, p. 770, pl. 85.
 1913. Japanese nudibranchs. Journal of the College of Science, Imperial University Tokyo 35:1-47, pls. 1–2.
 1916. Mollusca Nudibranchiata. In: Fauna of the Chilka Lake. Memoirs of the Indian Museum 5:375-380.
 1916a. Zoological results of a tour in the far east. Mollusca Nudibranchiata. Memoirs Asiatic Society Bengal 6
 with T. J. Evans. 1908. Doridoeides gardineri: a doridiform cladohepatic nudibranch. Quarterly Journal of Microscopical Science 52(2):279-299, pls. 15–16.

Species
The World Register of Marine Species mentions 119 marine taxa named by Charles Eliot. Eliotia Vayssière, 1909, a nudibranch genus was named after him.

Species described by Charles Eliot include:

 Acanthodoris falklandica Eliot, 1907
 Bathydoris hodgsoni Eliot, 1907
 Bornella simplex Eliot, 1904
 Ceratophyllidia africana Eliot, 1903
 Cerberilla africana Eliot, 1903
 Chelidonura punctata Eliot, 1903
 Chelidonura varians Eliot, 1903
 Chromodoris africana Eliot, 1904
 Chromodoris cavae Eliot, 1904
 Chromodoris inconspicua Eliot, 1904
 Chromodoris splendens Eliot, 1904
 Crosslandia viridis Eliot, 1902
 Cuthona henrici Eliot, 1916
 Doridomorpha gardineri Eliot, 1903
 Doto antarctica Eliot, 1907
 Doto oscura Eliot, 1906
 Elysia chilkensis Eliot, 1916
 Elysia hendersoni Eliot, 1899
 Elysia japonica Eliot, 1913
 Ercolania zanzibarica Eliot, 1903
 Geitodoris reticulata Eliot, 1906
 Halgerda wasinensis Eliot, 1904
 Halgerda willeyi Eliot, 1904
 Lomanotus vermiformis Eliot, 1908
 Marionia levis Eliot, 1904
 Marionia viridescens Eliot, 1904
 Miamira magnifica Eliot, 1904
 Notaeolidia depressa Eliot, 1905
 Notaeolidia gigas Eliot, 1905
 Platydoris pulchra Eliot, 1904
 Sclerodoris coriacea Eliot, 1904
 Sclerodoris minor Eliot, 1904
 Sclerodoris tuberculata Eliot, 1904
 Thordisa burnupi Eliot, 1910
 Tritoniella belli Eliot, 1907

See also 
List of Ambassadors from the United Kingdom to Japan
Anglo-Japanese relations
Buddhism in Japan
Edward Carlyon Eliot
Charles William Eliot

Notes

References
 Winckworth, Ronald. (1931). "Obituary. Sir Charles Eliot, 1862–1931," Proceedings of the Malacological Society of London 19(5): 224–226.
 J. R. le B. Tomlin, 1931. Obituary notice: Sir Charles Eliot. Journal of Conchology 19(5): 145
 A. Vayssière, 1932. Nécrologie. Sir Charles Eliot. Journal de Conchyliologie 76(2): 139–142.
 G. B. Sansom & J. M. Hussey, 2004. Eliot, Sir Charles Norton Edgcumbe. Oxford Dictionary of National Biography 18: 49–50.
 Nish, Ian. (2004). British Envoys in Japan 1859–1972. Folkestone, Kent: Global Oriental. ;  OCLC 249167170

External links

 
 
 
 UK in Japan,  Chronology of Heads of Mission
 National Archives,  Eliot, Charles Norton Edgcumbe

1862 births
1931 deaths
Ambassadors of the United Kingdom to Japan
British diplomats in East Asia
People from Cherwell District
People educated at Cheltenham College
Alumni of Balliol College, Oxford
Colonial governors and administrators of Kenya
Academics of the University of Sheffield
Vice-Chancellors of the University of Hong Kong
Companions of the Order of the Bath
Knights Grand Cross of the Order of St Michael and St George
Members of the Privy Council of the United Kingdom
English malacologists
East Africa Protectorate people
British Kenya people
Vice-Chancellors of the University of Sheffield